The 2004 mid-year rugby union tests (also known as the Summer Internationals in the Northern Hemisphere) refer to international rugby union matches that are played through June, mostly in the Southern Hemisphere.

Four test series took place in the window with Argentina hosting Wales, Australia hosting Scotland, New Zealand hosting England and South Africa hosting Ireland.

The Pacific Islanders played matches against Australia, New Zealand and South Africa, losing all three matches.

Overview

Series

Other tours

Matches

Week 1

Week 2

Week 3

Week 4

Week 5

Week 6

Week 7

Week 8

Week 9

See also
 Mid-year rugby union tests
 2004 end-of-year rugby union tests

References

2004
2004–05 in European rugby union
2003–04 in European rugby union
2004 in Oceanian rugby union
2004 in North American rugby union
2004 in South American rugby union
2004 in South African rugby union
2004–05 in Japanese rugby union
2003–04 in Japanese rugby union
2004 June